Queer Destinations is a travel and tourism company based in Mexico City, Mexico that focuses on LGBTQ+ related travel and tourism.

Overview
The company focuses on developing international LGBTQ+ tourism. It also provides certification lists of destinations, hotels, and services, considering them to be "QD certified" if they meet certain standards for international LGBTQ+ tourists. The company collaborates closely with the International LGBTQ+ Travel Association to develop LGBTQ+ tourism throughout the Spanish-speaking world, particularly in Mexico.

Queer Destinations focuses on destinations throughout Mexico, including Oaxaca, Yucatán, Morelos, Mexico City, Los Cabos, Guadalajara, and many other parts of Mexico. Oriol Pamies, a Spanish businessman, is currently the executive of the company.

See also
International LGBTQ+ Travel Association
LGBT tourism

References

LGBT tourism
International LGBT organizations
Travel-related organizations
Tourism in Mexico